Cornwall and Plymouth was a European Parliament constituency covering the county of Cornwall and the city of Plymouth in Devon, England.

Prior to its uniform adoption of proportional representation in 1999, the United Kingdom used first-past-the-post for the European elections in England, Scotland and Wales. The European Parliament constituencies used under that system were smaller than the later regional constituencies and only had one Member of the European Parliament each.

When it was created in England in 1979, it consisted of the Westminster Parliament constituencies of Bodmin, Falmouth and Camborne, North Cornwall, Plymouth Devonport, Plymouth Drake, Plymouth Sutton, St Ives and Truro. In 1984, Bodmin was replaced by South East Cornwall.

The constituency was replaced by Cornwall and West Plymouth and a small part of Devon and East Plymouth in 1994, and these seats became part of the much larger South West England constituency in 1999.

Members of the European Parliament

Results

References

External links

 David Boothroyd's United Kingdom Election Results

European Parliament constituencies in England (1979–1999)
Politics of Cornwall
Politics of Plymouth, Devon
1979 establishments in England
1994 disestablishments in England
Constituencies established in 1979
Constituencies disestablished in 1994